The 2021 Horizon League women's soccer tournament was the postseason women's soccer tournament for the Horizon League. It was held from October 31 through November 6, 2021. The quarterfinals of the tournament were held at campus sites, while semifinals and final took place at Engelmann Field in Milwaukee, Wisconsin. The six team single-elimination tournament consisted of three rounds based on seeding from regular season conference play. The Milwaukee Panthers were the defending champions, and they successfully defended their title by beating the Oakland Golden Grizzlies 2–0 in the final. This was the fourteenth overall title for Milwaukee and fourth for head coach Troy Fabiano.  This was also Milwaukee's fourth consecutive title. As tournament champions, Milwaukee earned the Horizon League's automatic berth into the 2021 NCAA Division I Women's Soccer Tournament.

Seeding 
Six Horizon League schools participated in the tournament. Teams were seeded by conference record.  No tiebreakers were required as each team finished on a unique points total.

Bracket

Semifinal matchups were determined by the results of the quarterfinals. The #1 seed would play the lowest-remaining seed, while the #2 seed would play the other quarterfinal winner.

Schedule

Quarterfinals

Semifinals

Final

Statistics

Goalscorers

All-Tournament team

Source:

MVP in bold

References 

2021 Horizon League women's soccer season
Horizon League Women's Soccer Tournament